Patrick Dean McNally (born 20 December 1937) is a British businessman, former journalist and racing driver. He was the founder and chief executive of Allsport Management, which controlled Formula One advertising and corporate hospitality with the Paddock Club. 

Beginning his career as a motorsports journalist for Autosport magazine, after racing for two seasons in 1968-1969, McNally became a sponsorship consultant for Marlboro. In 1983, McNally founded Allsport Management SA, a Swiss-based company which acquired the advertisement rights for Formula One circuits. By 1984, the company had expanded its operations and established the F1 Paddock Club, the exclusive hospitality provider. McNally worked closely with Bernie Ecclestone, and together they are credited as being the principal architects of modern Formula One.

Family and early life 
McNally was born in Gravesend on 20 December 1937. His father was Group Captain Patrick McNally, a Royal Air Force medical officer from Monaghan stationed in Iraq, Egypt and West Africa during the Second World War. His mother, Mary Dean Outred, was of English background in Kent. Peter McNally (1933–2021), his elder brother, was a socialite and businessman for Granada plc. McNally grew up in Ireland during the war, at Poplar Vale, County Monaghan.

In 1967, McNally married Anne Downing, daughter and heiress of Monaco-based racing driver Ken Downing, a successful Connaught driver in the 1952 Formula One season who went on to establish a business diamond mining in South Africa. In 1969, their first son, Sean, was born, and in 1972 their second son, Rollo. McNally and his wife divorced shortly before she died from cancer in 1980. He has remained a widower since.

Racing career 

Throughout the 1960s, McNally was involved in Touring car racing and Le Mans. In 1962, he raced a Lotus Elite at Castle Combe circuit for the British Racing and Sports Car Club (BRSCC) and finished second. By 1965, McNally raced a Shelby Cobra at Goodwood, Silverstone and Nürburgring. He subsequently entered for two seasons in the 1968 and 1969 British Saloon Car Championship, driving a Porsche 911 T/R and winning several races. He retired from professional racing in 1970, becoming primarily focused on journalism and the commercial side of motorsport.

Marlboro 
McNally started his Formula One career as a motorsports journalist in the late 1960s, contributing to Autosport magazine in London. By the early 1970s, he was working in Switzerland as a sponsorship consultant for Philip Morris's Marlboro, headquartered in Lausanne. During this period he was also driver manager for James Hunt, a McLaren driver sponsored by Marlboro, whom McNally was good friends with. Hunt went on to win the 1976 Formula One season.

Allsport Management 

In the early 1970s, McNally came into contact with Bernie Ecclestone, and by 1983, founded Allsport Management SA, a company which provided corporate hospitality and reformed trackside advertising for Formula One events. McNally's company obtained the Formula One advertising rights after a fee was paid to Ecclestone, who needed an experienced sponsorship manager to run the advertisements. Based in Geneva, Switzerland, Allsport then had full control of the lucrative advertising rights, which it acquired from each organiser and sponsor. 

McNally had developed a system of signage which gave advertisers maximum exposure. Formula One and related companies were under pressure from the European Broadcasting Union to introduce standards in their advertising, and McNally was encouraged by Ecclestone to form his company as such. He stated that he had formed a solution to "tidy up" trackside advertising with a strategy called "themed advertising", whereby one advertiser is given full exposure at each section of the course; essentially, reducing the number of advertisers and repackaging the way they were sold. This strategy proved very successful. McNally ultimately took over the sales of all Formula One trackside advertising, with the exception of the Monaco Grand Prix.

Paddock Club 

The F1 Paddock Club, established by McNally in 1984, was the Formula One hospitality provider and appeared to be modelled on Royal Ascot as noted by Sheridan Thynne. Set up at each Grand Prix around the world, with particular emphasis at Abu Dhabi and Saudi Arabia events, the hospitality concept was McNally's innovation and managed by Allsport. The Paddock Club offered luxury dining, tours and superior views for VIPs at Formula One events and turned into a highly profitable business.

CVC acquisition 

On 30 March 2006, McNally sold Allsport Management to CVC Capital Partners, who acquired the company via Alpha Topco. The figure agreed was estimated around $400 million. McNally remained chief executive of the company until April 2011, when he announced his retirement from the Formula One circuit.

Personal life 
McNally dated Sarah Ferguson between 1981 and 1986 before her marriage to Prince Andrew, Duke of York. Ferguson was 'desperate' to marry McNally, but ultimately became engaged to the Duke of York. The pair remain close friends. He is currently with his former cook Sarah Tyzack, who is nearly thirty years his junior.

McNally owns Warneford Place, Wiltshire, the former home of Ian Fleming. In 2004, the property was raided by the Johnson Gang. In addition to Warneford, his principal residence, McNally owns Buckland House, Oxfordshire, which he renovated. He also has homes in the Côte d'Azur and Switzerland, most notably in Verbier where his chalets are locally referred to as "the Castle", or occasionally "Cocaine Castle".

After retirement, McNally has indulged in a lavish lifestyle and is an avid partaker of skiing in Switzerland and shooting at his estate in Wiltshire.

References 

1930s births
Living people
Auto racing executives
Swiss businesspeople
British racing drivers
British motorsport people
Motorsport journalists
People from Gravesend, Kent
People from County Monaghan
British people of Irish descent
British socialites
British chief executives